Shai Bolton (born 8 December 1998) is a professional Australian rules footballer playing for the Richmond Football Club in the Australian Football League (AFL). He was drafted by Richmond in the second round of the 2016 draft and made his debut in round 9 of the 2017 season, as the club's youngest debutant in nine years. In 2018 he won the VFL's Mark and Goal of the Year awards while playing reserves grade football. Bolton was a premiership player with Richmond in each of the 2019 and 2020 seasons, the first of which he also received a Rising Star nomination in.

Junior football and early life
Bolton was born in Katanning, Western Australia and grew up in the southern Perth suburb of Forrestdale before spending his teenage years in Mandurah. He comes from strong footballing stocks, with father Darren a former Fremantle player and Peel Thunder best & fairest winner and his uncle Allistair Pickett a two-time Sandover Medalist.

In 2013 Bolton entered the elite talent pathway when he joined the Flying Boomerangs Indigenous Academy. He began playing underage football with WAFL club South Fremantle the following year. Bolton was sidelined for much of his 2015 season however after suffering stress fractures in his back. In his final season (2016) at the club he averaged 17 disposals and two goals per game, including a seven-goal performance against East Perth.

He represented Western Australia at the 2016 AFL Under 18 Championships, kicking five goals in the tournament.

Bolton attended high school at Wesley College in Perth, leaving after completing his year 11 studies to focus on football.

Prior to the 2016 national draft, Bolton was praised for his "blazing speed" and "natural instinct for the game". He impressed recruiters in October's pre-draft All Stars game at Punt Road Oval, recording 16 disposals, seven inside 50s and a goal. He placed second in the running vertical jump test at the national draft combine that year.

AFL career

2017 season

Before the season had even officially began, Bolton was charged with striking Tom Williamson in a VFL practice match against the Northern Blues. He subsequently accepted a one-match ban. Bolton made his AFL debut in round 9, 2017 in a match against  at Spotless Stadium and taking the place of the injured Dan Butler in the Richmond forward-line. At 18 years and 163 days, he was the youngest player to debut for Richmond since captain Trent Cotchin in the 2008 season. He was thought to have kicked a match-winning goal in the final two minutes of the match, before an automatic review overturned the umpire's on-field decision and ruled the kick touched off the boot. Bolton played in each of the next two matches before Richmond's bye week in round 12. To that point he ranked fourth in the AFL for forward half pressure. In round 13 Bolton turned in an impressive first half against , racking up 12 disposals and two goals to half time. Though he did not finish strongly, it was nevertheless an "impressive" performance. His 8 'crumbs' in that match also tied the record for the four-year old stat set by Sydney's Josh Kennedy in 2016. He was rested from the club's AFL side in round 15 however, after backing up that match with a four disposal game against .
Bolton returned to senior football in round 19 when he replaced the injured Jack Riewoldt, creating a forward-line without a recognised tall forward. He was dropped after just one match however, returning to the VFL to play out his season with the reserves. His performances at this level were labelled "above the level" by coach Craig McRae with media pundits suggesting he was close to a call-up to senior level during the AFL finals series. Despite this talk he would remain in the reserves, playing in each of the team's three victories as well as in their losing grand final against Port Melbourne. Champion Data figures released at the end of September showed Bolton as the second quickest player at Richmond and one of the 15 quickest in the AFL, after he set a top speed of 34.8 kilometres per hour in an in-match sprint during the season. Bolton finished the 2017 season having played six matches and kicked three goals at senior level. He also played 14 matches in the reserves and kicked 23 goals, good for the fourth most at the club.

2018 season

With premiership small forward Daniel Rioli still recovering from a serious foot injury, Bolton came out of a fitness-building off-season and straight into Richmond's senior forward line. He played in both of the club's official pre-season matches,  including a three-goal tally in that series' first match against . On the back of those performances he was selected to play in the round 1 season-opener against . Bolton was relatively ineffectual over the season's first two matches however, recording only three tackles and one goal in total and was subsequently dropped from Richmond's round 3 side. Despite his inability to impact at senior level, Bolton was immediately impressive in his first reserves match of the season, kicking three goals in Richmond's VFL win over Port Melbourne. The club was cautious with Bolton's injury, resting him from match play for one week. Upon his return to VFL football he recorded 17 disposals while being trialed in limited midfield minutes. The following week Bolton kicked two goals against  but was most notable for a spectacular mark that saw him earn the VFL's Mark of the Year award at season's end. He would also earn the competition's Goal of the Year when he scored from the forward pocket after repeatedly shrugging tackles during a match against the  reserves in early July. The goal, along with 22 disposals and eight tackles recorded in that win saw Bolton earn a second chance at AFL football in 2018. In his first two matches back at VFL level he was tried successfully in a half-back role, collecting 24 disposals while also rotating through the midfield in the second match of that short stretch. The experiment would not last long however, with Bolton sustaining a minor knee injury while training with the club in late July. Continued soreness in the joint saw Bolton undergo an arthroscope procedure, including a clean-up of the tissue around his meniscus. Bolton did not return to football in 2018, despite club officials earlier stating that he was likely to return in time for the VFL finals series. He finished the year having played three matches at AFL level and a further 13 with the club's reserves side in the VFL.

2019 season

Bolton signed a new one-year contract with Richmond in the month following the end of the 2018 season, re-committing despite having previously put contract negotiations on hold during the season itself. He spent the off-season completing extensive personal fitness training, leading AFL Media and the Herald Sun to label Bolton likely to be one of Richmond's breakout players that season in a new role that would include playing time in the midfield and on the wing. He began the year playing that role in VFL practice matches in March, including a key role with two goals in the club's final pre-season match against . Bolton's clearance work was fantastic as an inside midfielder in the VFL in early April, earning him a call up to his first AFL match of the year in round 4's match against . He played as a forward in that and one further match at AFL level, before being dropped back to the VFL. It was to be a short stint however, with Bolton turning in a best on ground performance with 25 disposals, 11 tackles and a goal that saw him returned to AFL level in round 7. For that performance he was also named in AFL Media's Team of the Week. Bolton kicked just one goal and averaged less than 11 disposals in the three weeks that followed, resulting in him being dropped to VFL level in the first week of June. He was immediately prolific at that level, playing as an inside midfielder and turning in two consecutive best afield performances in which he held averages of eight tackles, 30 disposals, nine clearances and a goal. At the point he ranked number one among the league's Rising Star eligible players for score involvements per game. That effort earned him five Coaches award votes (equal 3rd best on ground), selection to AFL Media's Team of the Week and a nomination for the league's Rising Star award. He played one more game with significant midfield minutes, before being named by AFL Media as one of the club's best players in round 19's win over  while playing his early-season role as a forward.

Bolton played largely as a forward with limited midfield time for the final month of the season before making the 40-man squad but ultimately being passed over for final selection in the league's 22Under22 team which recognises the best young players in the league.

In the week that followed, Bolton signed a new two-year contract extension with Richmond, reportedly rejecting outside interest from home town side . In the grand final, Bolton helped his side to an AFL premiership by recording 11 disposals, kicking one goal and applying immense forward-half pressure in what AFL Media labelled a "solid" game.

Bolton led the club for total goal assists (five) during the finals series while placing second at the club and equal 12th among all players in the competition by the same measure across the entirety of 2019. He finished what The Age and the Australian Associated Press labelled a "breakout" season by winning an AFL premiership, receiving five Brownlow Medal votes (fifth most among Richmond players) and placing 18th in the club's best and fairest count.

2020 season
Bolton received Richmond life membership in 2019/20 off-season for his contribution to the club's 2019 premiership win, but also underwent minor shoulder surgery that saw him on a non-contact pre-season training program through mid-February 2020. He also recorded 13 disposals in that match, which was played without a crowd in attendance due to public health prohibitions on large gatherings imposed as a result of the rapid progression of the coronavirus pandemic into Australia.

It was the first match of a reduced 17-round season, which was also played with quarter lengths reduced by one fifth in order to reduce the physical load on players who would be expected to play multiple matches with short breaks in the second half of the year. Just three days later, the AFL Commission suspended the season for an indefinite period after multiple states enforced quarantine conditions on their borders that effectively ruled out the possibility of continuing the season as planned. Bolton contributed one goal when the season resumed in June after an 11-week hiatus, before adding a further three goals across rounds 3 and 4 to lead all Richmond players with seven goals so far that season.

With the news that the club would soon be relocated to the Gold Coast in response to a virus outbreak in Melbourne, and with the knowledge that senior midfielder Shane Edwards would not travel with his teammates, the club opted to send Bolton to the reserves level during the weekend of round 5 to play as an inside midfielder in preparation to play the role at senior level. Bolton was prolific in that unofficial scratch match against 's reserves, earning a recall as an AFL midfielder in the following week's match against  on Richmond's new home of the Gold Coast. The Herald Sun labelled Bolton one of his side's best with 14 disposals and a goal in that game, and one week later he received six Coaches Association Award votes for an equal-second-best on ground performance that included 19 disposals and five clearances.

Bolton continued to be among his side's best players over the next month, adding hauls of four, two and eight coaches votes for midfield contributions in rounds 8, 9 and 10 respectively. After round 11, Bolton ranked first among all players in the league that season for total inside-50s (48) and first at Richmond for centre clearances (18) and score involvements (58).

In round 13, Bolton was best on ground in Richmond's Dreamtime in Darwin win over  while the team wore an Indigenous artwork guernsey he had designed with the help of his family. He received the Yiooken Award for a performance, which included a then-equal career-high 29 disposals, along with five clearances and a goal. Across the final 12 rounds of the season, he had ranked fifth and sixth respectively for inside-50s and total score involvements among all players in the league. At the end of the regular season, Bolton placed second among Richmond players with nine Brownlow Medal votes, was one of Richmond's three nominees for the AFL Players' Association's league MVP award and was nominated as a midfielder in the 22under22 squad that recognises the best young players in the league, though ultimately went unselected in the final team of the fan-voted award.

Bolton returned in the first week of the finals but with fewer midfield minutes owing to the return of Shane Edwards and Dion Prestia in their own midfield roles. In a preliminary final win over  the following week, Bolton made a strong contribution of 15 disposals and six score involvements. Bolton became a dual premiership player one week later, recording four goal assists, 16 disposals and an equal match-high seven tackles. The Age noted Bolton's performance saying Richmond's 31-point victory "came on the back of (his) brilliant second half". He recorded coaches votes for the third consecutive match, earning tenth place overall in the Gary Ayres award for the player of the finals.

In addition to premiership silverware, Bolton earned the Fred Swift medal for fourth place in the club's best and fairest award. At the end of the year, Bolton ranked fifth among midfielder/forwards and 35th overall in the Herald Suns list of the best players from the 2020 season.

Player profile
Bolton plays as an inside midfielder and rests as a small forward, after playing most of his first three seasons at AFL level exclusively as a small forward. He is notable for his explosive athletic attributes and creativity in contested ball situations.

Statistics
Updated to the end of round 23, 2022.

|-
| scope="row" style="text-align:center" | 2017
|style="text-align:center;"|
| 29 || 6 || 3 || 4 || 26 || 25 || 51 || 12 || 15 || 0.5 || 0.7 || 4.3 || 4.2 || 8.5 || 2.0 || 2.5 || 0
|-
| scope="row" style="text-align:center" | 2018
|style="text-align:center;"|
| 29 || 3 || 1 || 1 || 11 || 14 || 25 || 6 || 4 || 0.3 || 0.3 || 3.7 || 4.7 || 8.3 || 2.0 || 1.3 || 0
|-
| scope=row bgcolor=F0E68C | 2019#
|style="text-align:center;"|
| 29 || 19 || 15 || 12 || 143 || 123 || 266 || 58 || 65 || 0.8 || 0.6 || 7.5 || 6.5 || 14.0 || 3.1 || 3.4 || 5
|-
| scope=row bgcolor=F0E68C | 2020#
|style="text-align:center;"|
| 29 || 14 || 12 || 6 || 135 || 89 || 224 || 43 || 38 || 0.9 || 0.4 || 9.6 || 6.4 || 16.0 || 3.1 || 2.7 || 9
|-
| scope="row" style="text-align:center" | 2021
|style="text-align:center;"|
| 29 || 20 || 23 || 20 || 208 || 185 || 393 || 82 || 55 || 1.1 || 1.0 || 10.4 || 9.2 || 19.6 || 4.1 || 2.7 || 5
|-
| scope="row" style="text-align:center" | 2022
|style="text-align:center;"|
| 29 || 22 || 41 || 41 || 249 || 144 || 393 || 72 || 48 || 1.9 || 1.9 || 11.3 || 6.5 || 17.9 || 3.3 || 2.2 || 12
|- scope="row" style="background-color: #EAEAEA; font-weight:bold; text-align: center; width:2em" class="sortbottom"
| colspan=3| Career
| 89
| 98	
| 89
| 818
| 611
| 1429
| 288
| 241
| 1.1
| 1.0
| 9.2
| 6.9
| 16.1
| 3.2
| 2.7
| 31
|}NotesHonours and achievementsTeam 2× AFL premiership player: 2019, 2020
 McClelland Trophy: 2018Individual All-Australian team: 2022
 AFL Rising Star nominee: 2019
 Mark of the Year: 2021VFL Goal of the Year: 2018
 Mark of the Year': 2018

Personal life
Bolton is an Indigenous Australian of the Noongar people. He is the son of former Fremantle player Darren Bolton and is related to the famous Pickett (mother's family) and Krakouer (maternal grandmother) footballing families.

References

External links

 
 

Living people
1998 births
Australian rules footballers from Western Australia
South Fremantle Football Club players
Richmond Football Club players
Richmond Football Club Premiership players
Indigenous Australian players of Australian rules football
People educated at Wesley College, Perth
Noongar people
Two-time VFL/AFL Premiership players